Cheshmeh Sabz (also Romanized as Cheshmeh-ye Sabz, Chashmeh-e Sabz, and Chashmeh Sabz; also known as Cheshmeh Sabz Gholi, Mazār, and Sabzpūsh) is a village in Gughar Rural District, in the Central District of Baft County, Kerman Province, Iran. At the 2006 census, its population was 353, in 101 families.

References 

Populated places in Baft County